Todd Boyd, aka "Notorious Ph.D.", is the Katherine and Frank Price Endowed Chair for the Study of Race & Popular Culture and Professor of Cinema and Media Studies in the USC School of Cinematic Arts. Boyd is a media commentator, author, producer, consultant and scholar. He is considered an expert on American popular culture and is known for his pioneering work on cinema, media, hip hop culture, fashion, art and sports. Boyd received his PhD in Communication Studies from the University of Iowa in 1991 and began his professorial career at USC in the fall of 1992.

Media appearances 
Over the last two decades, Boyd has appeared in numerous documentaries covering a range of topics related to media and popular culture. Some recent appearances include The Last Dance (ESPN, 2020) and Vick (ESPN,2020), as well as The Movies (CNN, 2019), College Football 150: The American Game (ESPN, 2019), Sammy Davis Jr.: I Gotta Be Me (American Masters/PBS, 2019), I Am Richard Pryor (Comedy Central/Paramount Network, 2019) American Style (CNN, 2019), Dennis Rodman: For Better or Worse (ESPN, 2019), Shut Up and Dribble (Showtime, 2018), The Nineties (CNN, 2017) and The History of Comedy (CNN, 2017) among others. Dr. Boyd also appeared in Twenty Feet From Stardom (2013) winner of the 2014 Academy Award for Best Documentary Feature.

He has also been featured on many news and other programs including: NBC Nightly News, The Today Show (NBC), CBS Evening News, ABC World News Tonight, The News Hour (PBS), Frontline (PBS), Good Morning America (ABC), Biography (A & E) among others.

Books, articles and essays
Boyd is the author/editor of seven books and over 100 articles, essays, reviews, and other forms of commentary. Boyd is the author of The Notorious Ph.D's Guide to the Super Fly 70s: A Connoisseur's Journey Through the Fabulous Flix, Hip Sounds, and Cool Vibes That Defined a Decade (Harlem Moon/Broadway/Random House, 2007), Young Black Rich and Famous: The Rise of the NBA, the Hip Hop Invasion, and the Transformation of American Culture (Doubleday/Random House, 2003), The New H.N.I.C: The Death of Civil Rights and the Reign of Hip Hop (NYU Press, 2002), which was cited in the 10th Anniversary (September 2003) issue of VIBE Magazine as "one of the most significant books ever written on hip-hop," and Am I Black Enough For You?: Popular Culture from the 'Hood and Beyond (Indiana University Press, 1997).

He is also the editor of African Americans and Popular Culture Vol. 1–3 (Praeger/Greenwood, 2008), Basketball Jones: America Above the Rim (with Kenneth Shropshire, NYU Press, 2000) and Out of Bounds: Sports, Media and the Politics of Identity (with Aaron Baker, Indiana University Press, 1997).

His written work has also appeared in the New York Times, Los Angeles Times, Chicago Tribune, The Guardian, ESPN, and The Root.

Cinema
Boyd was the executive producer for the Netflix documentary, At All Costs (2016). He was writer/producer on the Paramount Pictures cult classic film The Wood (1999).

He has also provided voice-over commentary on the DVD edition of the films Stormy Weather (1943), Cabin in the Sky (1943), Super Fly (1972), and Uptown Saturday Night (1974).

Publications
African Americans and Popular Culture, Vol 1–3:  (Praeger, 2008)
The Notorious PhD's Guide to the Super Fly 70s:  (Harlem Moon/Broadway/Random House, 2007)
Young Black Rich and Famous: The Rise of the NBA, the Hip Hop Invasion, and the Transformation of American Culture:  (Doubleday/Random House, 2003)
The New H.N.I.C: The Death of Civil Rights and the Reign of Hip Hop:  (NYU Press, 2002)
Basketball Jones: America Above the Rim:  (NYU Press, 2000)
Out of Bounds: Sports, Media and the Politics of Identity:  (Indiana University Press, 1997)
Am I Black Enough For You? : Popular Culture from the 'Hood and Beyond:  (Indiana University Press, 1997)

Additional filmography 

The Last Dance (ESPN, 2020)
Vick (ESPN, 2020)
You Ain't Got These (Quibi, 2020)
Dave Parker: The Cobra in Twilight (MLB Network, 2019)
College Football 150: The American Game (ESPN, 2019)
 NFL 360: DeSean Jackson’s Bond with Nipsey Hussle (NFL Network, 2019)
 A Complicated Man: The Shaft Legacy (Shaft, DVD/Blu-Ray additional features 2019)
 Dennis Rodman: For Better or Worse (30 For 30, ESPN, 2019)
 I Am Richard Pryor (Paramount Network/Comedy Central, 2019) 
 Sammy Davis Jr.: I Gotta Be Me (American Masters/PBS, 2019) 
 American Style (CNN, 2019) 
 The Super Bowl That Wasn’t (NFL Network, 2019) 
 Shut Up and Dribble (Showtime, 2018) 
 The 2000s (CNN, 2018)
 “Ed Gordon Presents: Am I Black Enough?” feature documentary (Brown Sugar/Bounce TV 2018)
 Death Row Chronicles (BET, 2018) 
 The History of Comedy (CNN, 2017) 
 The Nineties (CNN, 2017) 
 American Race (TNT, May 2017) 
 The LA Riots: 25 Years Later (History Channel, 2017) 
 Soundtracks: Songs That Defined History (CNN, 2017) 
 Soundbreaking: Stories from the Cutting Edge of Recorded Music (PBS, 2016) 
 At All Costs: Life Inside the World of AAU Basketball (Netflix, 2016) 
 Jim Brown: A Football Life (NFL Network, 2016) 
 (Roots of Fight Presents) Ali: Birth of the Greatest (Spike TV, 2016) 
 Streets of Compton (A&E, 2016) 
 The Drew: No Excuse, Just Produce (Showtime, 2016) 
 Fresh Dressed (CNN Films, 2015) 
 Trojan Wars (30 For 30, ESPN, 2015) 
 Richard Pryor: Icon (PBS, 2014) 
 Twenty Feet From Stardom (2013) [Academy Award for Best Documentary Feature, 2014] 
 Iceberg Slim: Portrait of a Pimp (Showtime, 2012) 
 The Godfather Legacy (The History Channel, 2012) 
 Scarface: The Inside Story (Biography Channel, 2012) 
 Uprising: Hip Hop and the L.A. Riots (Rock Docs, VH1, 2012) 
 Planet Rock: The Story of Hip and the Crack Generation (Rock Docs, VH1, 2011) 
 Runnin’ Rebels of UNLV (HBO, 2011) 
 Straight Outta L.A. (30 For 30, ESPN, 2010) 
 Why We Laugh: Black Comedians on Black Comedy (Showtime, 2009) 
 Bloods and Crips: Made in America (Independent Lens, PBS, 2008) 
 N.W.A.: The World’s Most Dangerous Group (Rock Docs, VH1, 2008) 
 Notorious B.I.G.: Bigger Than Life (BET, 2007) 
 Dare Not Walk Alone (NAACP Image Award Nominee, 2006) 
 Perfect Upset: 1985 Georgetown vs. Villanova NCAA Championship (HBO, 2005) 
 The O.J. Verdict (Frontline/PBS, 2005) 
The N Word (Feature Documentary, 2004)
O.J. Simpson: A Study in Black and White (HBO, 2002)
Bill Russell: My Life, My Way (HBO, 2000)
The Harlem Globetrotters (Biography/A&E, 1999)

References

External links
Dr. Todd Boyd — Biographical Information
Faculty Profile —University of Southern California
American Way Magazine — Spotlight on Los Angeles Locals
2016 Interview in Zocalo Public Square
2018 Interview in Zocalo Public Square
Dr. Todd Boyd for ESPN:
Interracial relationships remain taboo to some
Dr. Todd Boyd for The Root:
Blaxploitation's Baadasssss History
Mad Men, Miles Davis and the Aesthetic of Cool
Why August Wilson Was No Tyler Perry
Dear Academy: Give Richard Pryor the Lifetime Achievement Oscar
R.I.P., Vibe, 1993–2009

USC School of Cinematic Arts faculty
African-American academics
Living people
1964 births
21st-century African-American people
20th-century African-American people